Loening Aeronautical Engineering Corporation was founded 1917 by Grover Loening and Henry M. Crane produced early aircraft and amphibious aircraft beginning in 1917. When it merged with Keystone Aircraft Corporation in 1928, some of its engineers left to form Grumman. Loening formed a new enterprise, Grover Loening Aircraft Company, in 1929, which eventually closed in 1932.

History 
 1917: Loening Aeronautical Engineering Company, 31 Street at East River, New York, New York. 
 1928: Merged with Keystone Aircraft Corporation as Loening Aeronautical Division.
 1929: Grover Loening Aircraft Company, Garden City, New York. 
 1932: Ended operations.

Aircraft

See also
List of military aircraft of the United States

References

External links

Aerofiles.com: Loening
Loening OA-1A at the National Air and Space Museum

Defunct aircraft manufacturers of the United States
American companies established in 1917
Manufacturing companies established in 1917
Manufacturing companies disestablished in 1932
1917 establishments in New York (state)
1932 disestablishments in New York (state)
1928 mergers and acquisitions
Defunct manufacturing companies based in New York City